Maruševec ( Kajkavian: Maršuvic, Maršovec, or Maršuvec) is a village and municipality in Croatia in Varaždin County.

According to the 2011 census, there are 6,381 inhabitants, in the following settlements:
 Bikovec, population 216
 Biljevec, population 258
 Brodarovec, population 202
 Cerje Nebojse, population 445
 Čalinec, population 572
 Donje Ladanje, population 1,166
 Druškovec, population 362
 Greda, population 567
 Jurketinec, population 422
 Kapelec, population 106
 Korenjak, population 82
 Koretinec, population 369
 Koškovec, population 222
 Maruševec, population 460
 Novaki, population 533
 Selnik, population 399
Fran Novak, Maruševec, population 1

The absolute majority of the population are Croats.

Notable buildings
Maruševec Castle

References

Municipalities of Croatia
Populated places in Varaždin County